Roberto Cunha Ribeiro Filho (born 26 April 1990) is a Brazilian professional football player who currently plays for Amora FC in Portugal as a centre-back.

Career
Born in Rio de Janeiro, Roberto moved to Portugal in 2007, joining the youth ranks of Alcanenense, and a year later FC Porto. After short one year spells in various clubs in Portugal and Brazil, mostly at regional level, in July 2014, he moved to Atlético Clube de Portugal in the Segunda Liga.

He made his professional debut on 17 August 2014 in a home draw against G.D. Chaves. seeing the club being relegated at the end of the season. Roberto then moved to GS Loures, where he was scouted by Sporting Kansas City in October 2015, following a Taça de Portugal match against Boavista. After completing the season with Loures, he signed with Cova da Piedade for the 2016–17 LigaPro.

References

External links

1990 births
Living people
Footballers from Rio de Janeiro (city)
Brazilian footballers
Association football defenders
A.C. Alcanenense players
Madureira Esporte Clube players
Atlético Clube de Portugal players
C.D. Cova da Piedade players
São Cristóvão de Futebol e Regatas players
Camboriú Futebol Clube players
S.C. Praiense players
Real S.C. players
Amora F.C. players
Campeonato de Portugal (league) players
Liga Portugal 2 players
Campeonato Brasileiro Série C players
Brazilian expatriate footballers
Expatriate footballers in Portugal
Brazilian expatriate sportspeople in Portugal